Night Hawk Lake is a lake in the city of Timmins, Cochrane District in northeastern Ontario, Canada. It is in the James Bay drainage basin and is the source of the Frederick House River, which flows via the Abitibi River and Moose River to James Bay.  Night Hawk Lake is the largest lake within the boundaries of the City of Timmins.

See also
List of lakes in Ontario

Tributaries
Clockwise from the Frederick House River outflow
Tincan Creek
Whitefish River
Night Hawk River
Forks River
Redstone River
Goose Creek
Porcupine River
Moose Creek

References

Other map sources:

Lakes of Cochrane District